Mahnomen City Hall is a 1937 fieldstone Moderne municipal center built by the Works Progress Administration at 104 West Madison Avenue, Mahnomen, Minnesota,  United States.

It was still a working city hall when it was added to the National Register of Historic Places in 1988.

See also
 National Register of Historic Places listings in Mahnomen County, Minnesota

References

City and town halls on the National Register of Historic Places in Minnesota
Government buildings completed in 1937
National Register of Historic Places in Mahnomen County, Minnesota
Works Progress Administration in Minnesota